Kosin Hembut (born April 4, 1982) simply known as Sin, is a Thai professional footballer who plays as a goalkeeper.

Honours

Club
Army United
 Thai Division 1 League: 2004-05

References

External links
Profile at Goal

1982 births
Living people
Kosin Hembut
Kosin Hembut
Association football goalkeepers
Kosin Hembut
Kosin Hembut
Kosin Hembut
Kosin Hembut
Kosin Hembut
Kosin Hembut
Kosin Hembut